"Crumbling Land" is a song by Pink Floyd from the soundtrack album of the film Zabriskie Point.

History
It is an up-tempo, country-styled song. David Gilmour and Rick Wright provided the vocals. In the booklet of Zabriskie Point soundtrack's reissue, there is a note about what David Gilmour said about the song in an interview; he described the song as "a kind of country & western number which he [film director Antonioni] could have gotten done better by any number of American bands. But he chose us — very strange.". The music is similar to instrumental "Unknown Song/Rain in the Country". Take 2 of "Rain in the Country" ends in "Crumbling Land". The song is titled "On the Highway" in the box set The Early Years 1965–1972.

See also

 Unknown Song

References

Pink Floyd songs
Songs written by David Gilmour
Songs written by Nick Mason
Songs written by Roger Waters
Songs written by Richard Wright (musician)